The 20th Mieczysław Połukard Criterium of Polish Speedway League Aces was the 2001 version of the Mieczysław Połukard Criterium of Polish Speedway Leagues Aces. It took place on March 31 in the Polonia Stadium in Bydgoszcz, Poland.

Starting positions draw 

 Tomasz Gollob - Bractwo-Polonia Bydgoszcz
 Robert Sawina - Atlas Wrocław
 Robert Dados - Atlas Wrocław
 Sebastian Ułamek - Atlas Wrocław
 Piotr Protasiewicz - Bractwo-Polonia Bydgoszcz
 Mirosław Kowalik - Apator-Adriana Toruń
 Roman Jankowski - Unia Leszno
 Grzegorz Walasek - Radson-Malma-Włókniarz Częstochowa
 Rafał Okoniewski - Pergo Gorzów Wlkp.
 Sławomir Drabik - BGŻ S.A.-Polonia Piła
 Jacek Gollob - BGŻ S.A.-Polonia Piła
 Wiesław Jaguś - Apator-Adriana Toruń
 Krzysztof Cegielski - Wybrzeże Gdańsk
 Przemysław Tajchert - Bractwo-Polonia Bydgoszcz
 Andrzej Huszcza - ZKŻ Polmos Zielona Góra
 Michał Robacki - Bractwo-Polonia Bydgoszcz
 (R1) Łukasz Stanisławski - Bractwo-Polonia Bydgoszcz
 (R2) Grzegorz Musiał - Bractwo-Polonia Bydgoszcz

Heat details

Sources 
 Roman Lach - Polish Speedway Almanac

See also 

Criterium of Aces
Mieczysław Połukard Criterium of Polish Speedway Leagues Aces